Schaps is a surname. Notable people with the surname include:

Eric Schaps (born 1942), education researcher
Mary Schaps (born 1948), Israeli-American mathematician

See also
Schaap